The following is the final results of the 1987 World Wrestling Championships. Men's Competition were held in Clermont-Ferrand, France and Women's Competition were held in Lørenskog, Norway.

Medal table

Team ranking

Medal summary

Men's freestyle

Men's Greco-Roman

Women's freestyle

References
UWW Database

World Wrestling Championships
W
Wrestling
W
International wrestling competitions hosted by Norway
International wrestling competitions hosted by France